Boys of England was a British boys' periodical issued weekly from 1866 to 1899, and has been called "the leading boys' periodical of the nineteenth century". The magazine was based in London.

Boys of England was edited by the publisher and former Chartist Edwin John Brett. By the 1870s it had a circulation of 250,000, and a mainly working-class readership. By comparison to middle-class competitors such as The Boy's Own Paper, Boys of England was relatively unconcerned with Empire. Subject matters which predominated were history, rebels, crime, romance, the paranormal, and public schools.

References

External links
 WorldCat record

1866 establishments in England
1899 disestablishments in England
Children's magazines published in the United Kingdom
Weekly magazines published in the United Kingdom
Defunct magazines published in the United Kingdom
Magazines established in 1866
Magazines disestablished in 1899
Magazines published in London